The North Slave Correctional Complex is prison in Yellowknife, Northwest Territories, Canada and the largest correctional facility in the territory. It consists of an adult male unit and a youth unit, and it houses inmates with security ratings from minimum to maximum security, as well as those awaiting trial. Since the closure of the Arctic Tern Young Offender Facility in 2011, the youth unit holds both male and female young offenders.

History
The complex is the result of the merger of the North Slave Correctional Centre and the North Slave Young Offender Facility in 2016. Previously, the two facilities were formally separate, though they were connected by a corridor and shared a gym.

The North Slave Lake Correctional Centre (now the Adult Male Unit) was built in 2004, replacing the Yellowknife Correctional Centre.

In 2015, the Auditor General of Canada's report on prisons in the Northwest Territories found that short-term prisoners in the complex were not receiving access to rehabilitation programs. 

In August 2016, the prison had its first escape, when an inmate climbed a fence in the exercise yard, and onto the roof. Following the escape, the yard was closed to inmates, leaving them with less access to the outdoors or to cultural programs practiced there. In 2017, inmates began a letter writing campaign to demand better access to programs and recreational opportunities.

References

Further reading
Inside Canada's Arctic Prison, Patrick Kane, 14 Oct 2015, Vice Magazine
Not much rehab, not much hope – report damns NWT’s jails, Ollie Williams, 3 Mar 2015, My Yellowknife Now

External links
 

Prisons in Canada
Buildings and structures in Yellowknife
2004 establishments in the Northwest Territories